Vladimir Schneiderov (Шнейдеров, Владимир Адольфович)  (1900-1973) was a Soviet-era explorer and educational film director. A member of the CPSU  since 1926, he was awarded the People's Artist of the RSFSR in 1969.

He was  targeted by the KGB for alleged anti-Soviet statements.  The alleged documents against him were destroyed by the KGB member who recruited CIA agent Aldrich Ames in the 1980s.

Filmography
 1924  По Самарканд, (About Samarkand)
 1924 По Узбекистану (About Uzbekistan)
 1925 Великий перелёт 
 1928 Подножие смерти
 1930 Эль-Йемен (Аl-Yemen) (About Yemen)
 1931  На высоте 4500
 1933 Два океана
 1934 Золотое озеро (fiction: U.S. title, The Golden Taiga)
 1935  Джульбарс
 1937 Ущелье Аламасов
 1938  Гайчи 
 1946—1959 киносерия «Путешествия по СССР» (series: Travels in the USSR)
 1953  Происхождение жизни (Origins of life)
 1958  Под небом древних пустынь (Under the ancient desert sky)
 1960 Чарльз Дарвин  (Charles Darwin)
 1962 Жозеф Марти (Joseph Martin)

Awards
Order of Lenin
Order of the Red Banner of Labor
Order of the Red Star (14 April 1944)
Honored Artist of the RSFSR (6 January 1955)
People's Artist of the RSFSR (29 September 1969)

References

Further reading
"Schneider, Vladimir Adol'fovich" - article from the Great Soviet Encyclopedia . 
 Biography of Shnejderov
 
 В. А. Разумный. Воспоминания современника о В. А. Шнейдерове
 Когда в гостях был целый мир… История «Клуба кинопутешествий» глазами одного из его создателей Материал на сайте Фонда Всемирная Энциклопедия Путешествий]
 Фильм о фильме "Эль-Иемен".

Russian film directors
1900 births
1973 deaths
Honored Artists of the RSFSR
People's Artists of the RSFSR
Jewish explorers
Soviet Jews